Paul Martin Fleming is an American restaurateur. He has developed a number of restaurant chains, including P. F. Chang's China Bistro, Fleming's Prime Steakhouse & Wine Bar, Pei Wei Asian Diner, Z’Tejas Grills, and Paul Martin's American Grill.

Early life 
Fleming is a native of Franklin, Louisiana, and was raised in New Iberia, Louisiana. His parents were Betty Angers and Robert Martin Fleming, his father worked as a superior court judge. His grandfather was a farmer. Fleming's access to fresh, local produce as a child was a large influence on his restaurant career.

Fleming graduated from both Louisiana State University and Loyola University. As a student at Loyola in New Orleans, Fleming first worked in the hospitality industry. When Fleming attended Louisiana State University, Fleming got his first restaurant job as a dishwasher at Saturday's. From there, he became busboy, server, bartender, and finally, the manager.

Fleming raised a family in Arizona. Then he moved to Calistoga, California in Napa Valley, where he and his first wife Kelly made wine from the organic grapes Paul grew. They purchased the land in 1998, and in 2002 the Kelly Fleming Winery was founded.

Fleming and his wife, Jody Goodenough-Fleming, currently reside in Southwest Florida where they are active members of the local community working with a variety of charitable organizations, in addition to continued focus on numerous projects in the restaurant space.

Career 
Prior to working in restaurants, Fleming worked in the oil industry. When the oil industry collapsed, Fleming moved to Los Angeles. There, he began purchasing franchise rights to Ruth's Chris Steak House, which he acquired in three states: California, Arizona, and Hawaii. 

In 1984, Fleming opened his first Ruth's Chris in Beverly Hills. In 1985, he opened another in Phoenix. Fleming opened his third location in San Francisco and a fourth in Hawaii. He eventually sold all of the franchises back to Ruth's Chris.

Fleming  is the Founder P.F. Chang's China Bistro. The first of the now-cross-country restaurant chain appeared in Scottsdale, Arizona in 1993. The name P.F. Chang's is derived from Paul Fleming's initials (“PF"). He also conceptualized Pei Wei Asian Diner, a casual, quick-service offshoot of P.F. Chang's. P.F. Chang's was sold in 2012 for $1.1 billion.

With co-founder Bill Allen, Fleming developed another restaurant chain that bears his name: Fleming's Prime Steakhouse & Wine Bar, which started in 1998 in Newport Beach, California. Fleming's is operated as a joint venture with Bloomin’ Brands (NASDAQ:BLMN.O) and has grown to 65 locations across the U.S.

In 2006, Fleming began tinkering with a new concept, Paul Martin's American Grill, with restaurant industry veteran Brian Bennett. Specializing in Classic American cuisine, the first grill opened in 2007 in Roseville, California. There are now six restaurants in California, one in Arizona, and one in Austin, Texas. 

In 2019, Fleming made a minority investment in a Barcelona-inspired tapas restaurant Boqueria. Fleming also invested in the Tex-Mex restaurant Tacos & Tequila Cantina, which he later sold in 2021.

In 2020, Fleming partnered with Naples, Florida developer and restaurateur, Adam Smith to expand and grow the popular Lake Park Diner by Smith Organics. The use of steroids, antibiotics, hormones, or GMOs are not present in any of the food offered at Lake Park Diner, and this locally loved brand is poised for growth and expansion with a second location planned to open in Summer 2022.  

Fleming and his wife, Jody Goodenough-Fleming, co-founded PJK Neighborhood Chinese in 2021. The Florida-inspired, neighborhood Chinese restaurant brand will debut in Naples, Florida in late 2022. Jody Goodenough-Fleming is CEO of Paul Fleming Restaurants leading strategic growth plans for PJK and new emerging concepts in the state of Florida.

References 

American restaurateurs
Year of birth missing (living people)
Living people
People from Franklin, Louisiana
People from New Iberia, Louisiana
Businesspeople from Louisiana
Louisiana State University alumni
Loyola University New Orleans alumni
20th-century American businesspeople
21st-century American businesspeople